Askim may refer to:

Askim, a municipality in Østfold, Norway
Askim, Sweden, a borough in Gothenburg, Sweden
Askim Hundred, a geographic division in Västergötland, Sweden

See also
"Askim" - a song by jazz saxophonist Kamasi Washington on the album The Epic.